The SMU Mustangs men's soccer team represents Southern Methodist University in men's college soccer. The team currently competes in The American Athletic Conference. The Mustangs made their most recent appearance in the NCAA National Tournament in 2019, their third consecutive tournament appearance and fourth in five seasons. In 2019 the Mustangs reached their thirteenth Elite Eight before falling to No.1 Seed Virginia 3–2 in overtime. The Mustangs also claimed their third consecutive American Athletic Conference Tournament Title defeating Central Florida 1–0 in Orlando. This was the third consecutive year UCF and SMU meet in the AAC Tournament final as the Mustangs claimed their fifth conference title over the last three seasons. In 2017, the Mustangs  reached the round of sixteen for the 18th time in program history. In 2017, they also became the first program in American Athletic Conference history to claim both the regular season and conference tournament championship, a feat they repeated in 2018 defeating Temple 2–1 in the final game of the regular season and defeating UCF in a shootout in Orlando in the AAC Tournament Final. The Mustangs have been one of the top men's collegiate sides in the NCAA since being founded in 1975, and are regularly featured in Top 25 polls. The Mustangs used to be coached by former FC Dallas and current Grand Canyon University coach Schellas Hyndman. Current FC Dallas coach Luchi Gonzalez played for the Mustangs from 1998 to 2001.

History 
During the 2006 season, the SMU men's soccer program was ranked No. 1 in the nation for four consecutive weeks. The team sat atop the four national polls with a record of 13-0-2 in the Adidas/NSCA poll, SoccerTimes.com poll, Soccer America Magazine poll, and the CollegeSoccerNews.com poll. Concurrently, the SMU women's soccer program cracked the top 25, at No. 22 in the Adidas/NSCA poll and No. 19 in the SoccerTimes.com poll.

On November 6, 2006, the SMU men's soccer team finished the regular season ranked No. 2 in the nation. Additionally, SMU won the C-USA title game, beating Kentucky 2–0 in Tulsa. This C-USA championship win is the sixth conference title for SMU since 1997.

The SMU men's soccer team finished the 2010 season with an overall record of 16-2-2. The Mustangs finished the season strong with a trip to the Elite Eight where they lost to University of North Carolina at Chapel Hill in a penalty kick shootout.

In 2015, the Mustangs were led by first year head coach Kevin Hudson to the regular season American Athletic Conference title and reached the Round of 16 in the NCAA National Tournament where they were eliminated by Akron 2–1.

The Mustangs finished the 2017 season ranked No. 10 in the Top Drawer Soccer Rankings with an overall record of 17-3-1. They became the first program in American Athletic Conference history to claim the "double", winning both the regular season and conference tournament when they defeated the University of Central Florida 2–1 in Dallas. On January 20, 2018, SMU had two players selected in the 2018 MLS draft with Michael Nelson being selected by the Huston Dynamo with the 20th overall pick and Mauro Cichero being selected by FC Dallas with the 29th overall pick. SMU Defender Jordan Cano signed as a homegrown player for FC Dallas prior to the draft bringing the total to three players entering the MLS from the 2017 team.

In 2018, the Mustangs once again had a first round draft MLS Superdraft Selection as midfielder Emil Cuello was selected 19th overall by the LA Galaxy.

After their most recent season, the Mustangs had a player taken in the first round of the MLS Superdraft for the third consecutive year as Garrett McLaughlin was selected eighth overall by the Houston Dynamo. Hermann Trophy and First-Team All American Eddie Munjoma was also signed to a MLS Homegrown contract by FC Dallas while defender Phil Ponder was signed to USL contract by North Texas SC. The Mustangs finished the 2020 campaign ranked at No. 5 in the TopDrawer Soccer Poll, No. 7 in the United Soccer Coaches Poll, and No. 3 in the NCAA RPI Index.

Stadium 

Built in 1994, Westcott Field is the home venue for the SMU Mustangs men's and women's soccer team. The stadium seats 4,000. In the spring of 2020, SMU announced a $5 Million dollar gift was given by SMU Alums Heather and Ray W. Washburne for the creation of the Washburn Soccer and Track Stadium. The 1,800 seat and 2,500 overall capacity facility will provide the Mustangs with one of the best college soccer stadiums in the country.

Fans

Rivalries 

While SMU is traditionally rivals with TCU (Texas Christian University), University of Texas in Austin, Texas A&M, Rice, University of Houston and UTEP, these fellow schools do not fund varsity soccer programs, thus hindering the rivalry on the soccer field for the Mustangs. SMU and TCU were rivals when TCU did field a team for many years. TCU's team was an NCAA Division 1 program up until the enforcement of Title IX in the late 1990s to early 2000s. Due to the enforcement of Title IX, TCU lost their men's division 1 men's soccer program and it was converted to a club team only. TCU does continue to field a women's division 1 program. SMU and TCU played many battles throughout the years for the bragging rights of who was the stronger program in the Dallas/FT Worth metroplex. Generally, they would play one home and one away game against TCU per season. Some of the battles were very close but for the most part SMU was the stronger program due to the fact they had better funding for their soccer program (scholarship money) and thus were able to recruit higher level players. Currently, their main rivals in soccer due to geographic proximity are the Tulsa Golden Hurricane and Midwestern State University in Wichita Falls, Texas.

Roster

2020–21 squad

Team Management 

Coaching Staff

Head coaches 
Statistics correct as of the end of the 2018 NCAA Division I men's soccer season

References

External links
 

 
1975 establishments in Texas